WNGN-LD, virtual channel 38 (UHF digital channel 36), is a low-powered Heartland-affiliated television station licensed to Troy, New York, United States and serving the Capital District of New York. WNGX-LD (virtual channel 42, UHF digital channel 33) in Schenectady serves as a translator of WNGN. The stations are owned by Brian A. Larson.

History

WNGN-LD

WNGN-LP started as W04AT, then received the call-sign and channel W26BL on channel 26 on September 21, 1994, before receiving its current channel and call-sign on December 23, 1994. In 1992, Larson acquired WNGN-LP (then W26BL), a small TV translator in Hoosick Falls, New York, that rebroadcast educational programming for the Hoosick Falls Central School District. He applied to switch the city of license (COL) to Troy, and eventually moved the transmitter to its current site on Bald Mountain.

For the station's entire history, WNGN was affiliated with FamilyNet. FamilyNet ceased network operations in 2017 when it transitioned to the subscription-only The Cowboy Channel.

WNGX-LD
WNGX-LD started with an experimental license and callsign of 940414FX on January 18, 1996. It was upgraded to become W04DA on channel 4 later that same day. On July 13, 1998, the station was upgraded again to become WNGX-LP and gained its current channel allocation. On September 11, 2009, the station converted to digital broadcasting and its call sign changed to WNGX-LD.

Channel 35
The table of allotments for the Albany–Schenectady–Troy metro originally designated channel 35 as a reserved non-commercial channel. Local public station WMHT had expressed interest in the allotment for years but switched focus to digital upgrades on channel 17. Prior to being reserved for noncommercial use, channel 35 originally signed on the air in 1952 as the first UHF station in the region. After only two years on the air the station failed because most television receivers were incapable of receiving UHF signals. The owners switched to VHF channel 13 in Saratoga Springs which later moved to Albany, where today they still operate as NBC affiliate WNYT. WNGN-LP also transmits on channel 35 from the same tower and transmitter building as the original 35 used.

Technical information

Subchannels
The station's digital signal is multiplexed:

WNGN-LD broadcasts four digital subchannels, while WNGX-LD does not broadcast any programming.

Analog-to-digital conversion
Larson holds a construction permit to convert the station to a Low-power Digital (-LD) transmitter with an effective radiated power of only 0.14 kW. He will retain the analog channel number by using what is known as digital flash.

ABC affiliate WTEN-DT (channel 10) has decided to use channel 35 for its digital home, thus displacing WNGN-LP from the dial. Under the Commission's rules, low power stations must surrender their channel to a full power applicant. On February 2, 2007, WNGN-LP applied to move its analog channel to 38. This is the second time WTEN has displaced WNGN-LP. For over ten years, WNGN-LP broadcast on channel 26 until that was designated for WTEN to use for digital transmissions causing WNGN-LP to move to channel 35.

References

NGN-LP
Low-power television stations in the United States